Den vita stenen ("The White Stone") is a 1964 Swedish children's book written by Gunnel Linde. In 1965, Linde received the Nils Holgersson Plaque for this book. In 1973, a TV version of the story was produced.

Plot
The book takes place in a village in the Swedish countryside during the 1930s. Fia and her mother Mrs Pettersson, a piano teacher, live in the big house of the village's "häradshövding" (a countryside local judge/lawspeaker), where the bad-tempered housekeeper Malin lives. People say bad things about Mrs Pettersson because she is useless and lazy as she just plays piano. Fia always gets teased by her school mates because she has a useless mother who is a piano teacher in their school.

One summer day, a boy called Hampus comes to the village together with his stepparents, his uncle who is a poor shoemaker and his wife, and their 6 children. The shoemaker's wife and her children think Hampus is stupid as he "always makes trouble and makes them move house" as they have changed home often. When Hampus and Fia meet, they don't want to say their real names. The two children, who are alienated, start their own fraternity and call themselves "Fideli" (Fia) and "Farornas konung" ("King of the Dangers", Hampus). They "fight" for a white stone and order each other on "missions": "when you have completed the "mission" you'll get the stone".

TV series
In 1973 a TV series with 13 parts, directed by Göran Graffman, based on the book, was produced.

Cast
Julia Hede as Ina Vendela Sofia "Fia" Pettersson
Ulf Hasseltorp as Hampus
Monica Nordquist as Mrs Pettersson
Ulf Johanson as the "häradshövding" (judge)
Betty Tuvén as Malin
Håkan Serner as Sivert Kolmodin, shoemaker, Hampus' uncle and stepfather
Maj-Britt Lindholm as Mrs Kolmodin
Ingemar Hasselquist as Henning Kolmodin, the shoemaker's eldest child
Cecilia Nilsson as Eivor Kolmodin, the shoemaker's daughter
Gunilla Söderholm as Siri Kolmodin, the shoemaker's daughter
Ann-Charlotte Lithman as Nanna Kolmodin, the shoemaker's daughter
Joakim Rundberg as Ture Kolmodin, the shoemaker's son
Robert Rundberg as Lulle Kolmodin, the shoemaker's son
Fanny Gjörup as Brita
Eva Dahlqvist as Essy
Pia Skagermark as Solbritt
Börje Mellvig as merchant
Björn Gustafson as baker Emilsson
Lars-Erik Liedholm as postmaster, Brita's father
Ove Tjernberg as "Farornas Konung", lion tamer at circus
Willy Peters as doctor
Karin Miller as schoolteacher

References and sources

External links
About the book
About the TV series (Swedish Film Database)

Swedish children's novels
1964 Swedish novels
1964 children's books
Swedish children's television series
1970s Swedish television series
1973 Swedish television series debuts